The ZIL-131 is a general purpose 3.5 tonne 6x6 army truck designed in the Soviet Union by ZIL. The basic model being a general cargo truck. Variants include a tractor-trailer truck, a dump truck, a fuel truck, and a 6x6 for towing a 4-wheeled powered trailer.

The ZIL-131 was introduced in 1966; it is a military version of the ZIL-130, and the two trucks share many components. The ZIL-131 6x6 has the same equipment as the GAZ-66 and Ural-375D.

The ZIL-130/131 was in production at the "AMUR" truck plant (as the AMUR-531340), with both gasoline and diesel engines, until 2012 when AMUR shut down and filed for bankruptcy.

Specification
Cab Design: Forward Engine 
Seating Capacity (cab): 3
Curb weight: 6700 kg 
Payload: 5000 kg plus trailer 5000 kg (on road), or 3,500 kg plus trailer 4000 kg off road. 
Suspension: solid axles with leaf springs.
Engine: V8 gasoline  (carburetor) ZIL-130
Displacement: 6,960 cc (bore 3.94", stroke 4.36")
Compression Ratio: 6.5:1.
Top speed: 80 km/h 
Brakes: drums, with pneumatic control. 
Stopping distance (at 35 km/h):  
Length:  
Width:  
Height:  (cab)/  (transport body)
Wheelbase: +
Track front/rear: /
Tire measures: 12.00x20
Maneuverability: turning circle 33'5.6", approach angle 36°, departure angle 40°, max. ascent angle 31° (with  load), ground clearance , overcome ford   
Tires: 305R20 
Tire Pressure: 7.1-60 p.s.i.(controlled). 
Fuel tanks: 2x45 gal. 
Fuel economy:  (city), 50 to 100 liters/100 km (cross-country). 
Price $7,300 to $8,300 USD
transmission: 5 m, 2-speed transfer case

Variants 

 ZIL-131 (ЗиЛ-131) - 3.5-ton cargo truck
 ZIL-131N (ЗиЛ-131Н) - 3.75-ton cargo truck with new ZIL-5081 engine, mass production started since December 1986
 ZIL-131V (ЗиЛ-131В) - tractor unit
 ATZ-3,4-131 (АТЗ-3,4-131) - fuel tanker 
 9P138 (9П138) - a 36-tube variant of the BM-21 "Grad" rocket launcher on ZIL-131.

ZIL-131 were equipped with diesel engine ZIL-0550 made by Ural Automotive Plant since 2002.

Users

 
 
 

  – Armed Forces of the Republic of Moldova
 – Mongolian Armed Forces

 
 

  – Ukrainian Armed Forces

  Transnistria

Former users

  – Hungarian Armed Forces

Gallery

See also
Ural-4320

References

Sources 
 инженер-конструктор В. Митрофанов. ЗИЛ-131. Новый автомобиль высокой проходимости // журнал "За рулём", № 8, 1967. стр.8-9

External links

English website for Russian Military Trucks
AMO ZIL official website
AMUR-531340

Military trucks of the Soviet Union
131
Military vehicles of Russia
Military vehicles introduced in the 1960s